Syed Azmat Hassan is a former Ambassador of Pakistan and a former senior faculty associate of the School of Diplomacy and International Relations at Seton Hall University, specialising in Diplomacy and Middle Eastern studies. He was associated with the Lahore University of Management Sciences in its Humanities and Social Sciences Department. He was born on 7 August 1944 in Sialkot, Pakistan to Syed Fida Hassan and Zeenat Hassan.He died on 13 January 2020.

Education
Syed Azmat Hassan studied at St. Anthony's High School in Lahore. In 1963 he was awarded a BA degree in Economics, Political Science and History by the University of the Punjab and in 1966 he obtained an MA in Economics from the University of Cambridge. He gained an MSc in Strategic Studies from Quaid-i-Azam University, Islamabad, in 1984.

Civil service
Since 1968, Hassan's civil service assignments have included ambassadorships in Malaysia, Syria (with responsibility for Lebanon) and Morocco. He has also served as Deputy Permanent Representative of Pakistan to the United Nations in New York City. He has been an Additional Secretary for foreign affairs and defence issues at the Pakistani Foreign Ministry, where he also served as head of the Middle East desk and as Director-General of the Afghanistan Division.

At the 1991 Food and Agriculture Organization conference in Rome, Hassan represented Pakistan as Additional Secretary. He was elected a joint vice-chairman at a conference convened by the International Atomic Energy Agency in 1994 to adopt the Convention on Nuclear Safety.

Academia
After ending his civil service career, Hassan joined the School of Diplomacy and International Relations in fall 2000 as an Adjunct Professor of Diplomacy and International Relations. He taught courses on the modern Middle East and Afghanistan and represented the School in numerous conferences.

Hassan became associated with the Lahore University of Management Sciences in 2006. There he taught a number of courses as an Adjunct Faculty member, and later as full-time Visiting Faculty.

Role in the Lawyers' Movement 
In 2008, Hassan and 25 other former ambassadors were co-signatories to a letter to the newly formed federal government that demanded the immediate restoration of deposed judges. They regretted the delay in abiding by the Murree Declaration and said there was no need to link restoration of the judges with constitutional amendments to reform the judiciary.

Other affiliations 
Hassan has been associated with various organisations, think-tanks, etc. He is Senior Adviser, Board of Sponsors, Center For War / Peace Studies. He is also associated with the Global Peace Foundation and serves on the boards of organisations including the New Jersey Division of the UNA-USA, and the Center for UN Reform Education.

Publications and presentations 
Hassan had been invited speaker at various fora in the United States, Germany, Malaysia, and Pakistan. He is also a frequent commentator on international affairs for television and radio. Hassan also writes widely on foreign affairs for the press. His articles and perspectives have appeared in the Daily Record (New Jersey), the Star-Ledger (New Jersey) and Dawn (Pakistan), The Daily Journalist, The Huffington Post. Among his publications and presentations are:

 Countering Violent Extremism: The fate of the Tamil Tigers  EastWest Institute New York; 14 May 2009
 Keynote Essay: 'Some Reflections on Pakistan' in 'Home and the World:South Asia in Transition'  Cambridge Scholars Press (This essay was in response to Shashi Tharoor's Opening Keynote for the 2005 Conference on South Asia at Rutgers University)
 Presentation: Faith and Diversity: Toward a Global Ethic for Inclusive and Moderate Societies' at Global Peace Convention, Kuala Lampur, Malaysia; 6 December 2013.
 Presentation: '''Islamic State of Iraq and Levant (ISIS)' on 22 October 2014.
 Guest Speaker: Lecture on Progress of the United States-Pakistani Coalition Against Terrorism'; The Guarini Center for Governmental Affairs lecture series in the Pope Lecture Hall on 23 September 2004.
 Essay: 'The United Nations in an era of globalisation' in '''Multilateral diplomacy and the United Nations today' by edited by James P. Muldoon, Jr. ... [et al.] Westview Press, c2005,2nd ed.
Lecture: 'Faith and Action at the Crossroads: The Role of Faith Leaders in the Public Square Today', at Global Peace Leadership Conference, Washington DC; September 2013.

References

External links 
School of Diplomacy website
Personal Blog

Year of birth missing (living people)
Living people
Alumni of the University of Cambridge
High Commissioners of Pakistan to Malaysia
Ambassadors of Pakistan to Morocco
Ambassadors of Pakistan to Syria
Seton Hall University faculty
St. Anthony's High School, Lahore alumni